Little Britches Rodeo is a television series airing on RFD-TV western lifestyle documents the lives of rodeo contestants and rodeo competition from the National Little Britches Rodeo Association Finals. Each season features over 100 interviews and stories. Dustin Hodge is the series showrunner. There are over 262 episodes and 10 seasons.

Episodes

Season 1

Season 2

Season 3

Season 4

Season 5

Season 6

Season 7

Season 8

Season 9

Season 10

References 

Little Britches Rodeo